Daniel Overmyer may refer to:

Daniel H. Overmyer (1924–2012), American businessman
Daniel L. Overmyer (1935–2021), Canadian historian of Chinese religion